Edward Elsworth Willard  (September 25, 1862 – January 11, 1929) was an American politician who served as Mayor of Chelsea, Massachusetts.

Early life
Willard was born in Lancaster, Massachusetts, on September 25, 1862, to Edman and Elizabeth E. Willard.

Family life
Willard married  Lissis Doan Nickerson of Chatham, Massachusetts, in that town in December 1895.

See also
 1920 Massachusetts legislature
 1921–1922 Massachusetts legislature

Notes

1862 births
Massachusetts city council members
Mayors of Chelsea, Massachusetts
Republican Party members of the Massachusetts House of Representatives
1929 deaths